Rajae Belmlih, also spelled Raja Belmalih (22 April 1962 – 2 September 2007), was a Moroccan-Emirati singer.

Career

Belmlih's career began with the Moroccan talent show, Mawahib. Her first major hit in the Arab World was Ya-Jara Wadina in 1986. The young Rajae, a University undergraduate at the time, decided to sing her first hit song at her Hassan II campus in front of her fellow students prior to the official premiere that same day.

She later settled and worked from Cairo, Egypt while continuing her studies in Arabic literature and Philosophy at Mohamed V University in Rabat. She graduated in 1995 and enrolled for a doctorate. Belmlih was named a UNESCO Goodwill Ambassador in 1999 for her numerous actions in favour of charities within the Arab world.

She was an outspoken supporter of women's education in the poorer parts of the Arab world. She was a widely admired and respected figure in her native Morocco but also elsewhere in the Arab world where her image as a highly educated singer is untainted. She was granted Emirati citizenship as a tribute by the ruling family in Abu Dhabi.

Death
Rajae Belmlih died in Rabat, Morocco on 2 September 2007, aged 45, after a long battle with breast cancer.

Albums
Ya Jara Wadeena (1986)
Sabri Alik Tal (1994)
Ya Ghayeb (1996)
Ietiraf (1998)
Shoq el oyoun (2002)
Haseb (2005)

References

External links
Rajae Belmlih Obituary (French)
Le Journal de Tanger: Rajae Belmlih biography (French)

20th-century Moroccan women singers
1962 births
2007 deaths
People from Rabat
Naturalized citizens of the United Arab Emirates
Moroccan emigrants to the United Arab Emirates
Deaths from breast cancer
Deaths from cancer in Morocco